Sunny Side Up is the second studio album by Scottish singer and songwriter Paolo Nutini, released on 29 May 2009 in Ireland and 1 June 2009 in the United Kingdom. Nutini and his band, the Vipers, toured the United States briefly before a UK tour prior to the album's release. The album debuted at number one on the UK Albums Chart. Nutini recorded the album himself with his band the Vipers, with Ethan Johns contributing mixing and production. The album features guest appearances from trombonist Rico Rodriguez and ?uestlove.

The album was the eighth best-selling album in the United Kingdom of 2009 and the sixth of 2010. On 3 January 2010, Sunny Side Up topped the UK Albums Chart for a second time, making it the first number-one album in the United Kingdom of 2010 and the decade.

On 19 February 2010, Colin Farrell presented Nutini with "Best International Album" for Sunny Side Up at the 2010 Meteor Awards. On 20 May 2010, Sunny Side Up won Best Album at the Ivor Novello Awards. The album was nominated for MasterCard British Album at the 2010 BRIT Awards.

Singles 
The first single from the album was "Candy", which reached No. 19 on the UK Singles Charts. The song is Nutini's third highest peak to date, after "Last Request" and "Pencil Full of Lead" (see below). The second single was "Coming Up Easy", reaching No. 62 on the UK Singles Chart. The song became his lowest charting single to date, spending just one week within the top 75.

The third single to be released was "Pencil Full of Lead". The song was released on 2 November 2009 and peaked at No. 17 on the UK Singles Charts. It is his second highest chart success and the biggest hit single from Sunny Side Up, spending 21 weeks inside the top 75. The fourth single from the album was "10/10". The song was released on 11 January 2010 as a digital download only single. Once "10/10" was released, the song debuted at No. 100 on the UK Singles Charts, peaking at #51. It spent a total of six weeks inside the top 75.

Critical reception 

The album received a generally favourable critical reception. AllMusic's Thom Jurek noted the move away from the sound of These Streets: "Nutini has taken huge chunks of America's (and Scotland's) pop and folk pasts and reshaped them in his own image," going on to describe it as "wise beyond this songwriter's years". Andy Gill of The Independent commented on Nutini's progress since his debut, saying the album "sees the singer making giant strides in several directions", and going on to say "don't be surprised if, come December, this is one of the year's biggest-selling albums." Neil McCormick of The Daily Telegraph was also positive, stating "his joyous second album organically blends soul, country, folk and the brash, horny energy of ragtime swing."

Some reviewers were less impressed. It was described by The Guardian'''s Caroline Sullivan as "not bad", with opening track "10/10" described as "jaunty enough to make you retch". Graeme Thomson of The Observer saw the album as an attempt by Nutini at "rebranding himself as a mongrel hybrid of John Martyn, Otis Redding and Bob Marley".

 Commercial performance 
The album debuted at number one on the UK Albums Chart with sales of over 60,000 copies, fighting off strong competition from Love & War'', the debut album of fellow male solo artist Daniel Merriweather. The album performed similarly well on the Irish Albums Chart, debuting at number two behind Eminem's new album before rising to the top of the charts the week after.

Track listing

Personnel 
Paolo Nutini – vocals, backing vocals, drums, percussion, acoustic guitar, piano
Donny Little – acoustic guitar, electric guitar, backing vocals
Mike McDaid – bass guitar, piano, Fender Rhodes, backing vocals
Dave Nelson – acoustic guitar, percussion, backing vocals
Seamus Simon – drums, percussion
Gavin Fitzjohn – tenor saxophone, baritone saxophone, trumpet, flugelhorn
Rico Rodriguez – trombone
Questlove – drums
James Poyser – piano
Ethan Johns – Hammond organ, celesta, mandolin, mellotron, omnichord, electric guitar, acoustic guitar, ukulele, Dobro, mandocello, bass guitar, baritone guitar, optigan, percussion
Matt Benbrook – bass guitar
Phil Cunningham – accordion, tin whistle
Simon Farrell – double bass
Steve Bentley Klein, Andrew Maddick – violin
Fiona Leggat – viola
Emma Wallace – cello
Malcolm Stevenson – backing vocals
Derek Green – backing vocals
Andy Gaine – backing vocals
Lance Ellington – backing vocals
Ricci P. Washington – backing vocals
Miguan A. Green – backing vocals
Fraser Speirs - Harmonicas

Charts

Weekly charts

Year-end charts

Decade-end charts

Certifications

References 

2009 albums
Paolo Nutini albums
Atlantic Records albums
Albums produced by Ethan Johns